WS-12 is a chemical compound that acts as a potent and selective activator of the TRPM8 calcium channel, which is responsible for the sensation of coldness produced by menthol. It is slightly less potent as a TRPM8 activator compared to icilin, but is much more selective for TRPM8 over related calcium channels. It produces analgesic and antiinflammatory effects in animal models with similar efficacy to menthol and a reduced side effect profile.

References 

Ion channel openers